The Havana Film Festival New York (HFFNY) is a film festival, based in New York City, that screens cinema from across Latin America with a special focus on Cuba and its film industry. It is a project of The American Friends of the Ludwig Foundation of Cuba, a 501(c)(3) tax-exempt organization with the mission of building cultural bridges between the United States and Cuba through arts projects.

Since 2000, HFFNY has presented films featured at the International Festival of New Latin American Cinema in Havana. The Festival includes lectures, panel discussions, networking receptions and film industry workshops.

History

Overview 
The Festival was founded in 2000 by Ivan Giroud, President of the Havana Film Festival in Havana; Carole Rosenberg, President of The American Friends of the Ludwig Foundation of Cuba; film producer Kenneth Halsband; and Marcia Donalds, who was a film professor at New York University Tisch School of the Arts.

In 2001, film producer and programmer Diana Vargas joined the festival, and since 2003 she has served as HFFNY's Artistic Director.

2000 - Inaugural festival 
The inaugural Havana Film Festival NY was held at the Anthology Film Archives from March 17–26, 2000. It featured an entirely Cuban program, and screened over 40 productions, including features, documentaries, shorts and animated films that provided an overview of 41 years of Cuban filmmaking while showcasing several award-winning films from Havana's International Festival of New Latin American Cinema. The first HFFNY also included seminars on Cuban films and their distribution in the United States. The event was opened by singer, songwriter, actor, and activist Harry Belafonte.

2001-2008 
The second HFFNY expanded its program to include Latin American films. It ran April 16–23, 2001 and featured over 60 films from Cuba, Spain, Mexico, Colombia, Bolivia, Ecuador, Uruguay, Puerto Rico, Nicaragua, Argentina, Peru, Chile, Venezuela, Brazil and Panama. Daily screenings took place in Manhattan at NYU's Cantor Film Center, Clearview Cinema, and Anthology Film Archives, and Sunnyside Center Cinemas in Queens. Approximately 8,000 people attended the 2001 HFFNY, according to the festival's co-director and programmer Pedro Zurita, in a 2002 New York Times interview.

The third HFFNY ran April 18–27, 2002 at venues in Manhattan, Queens, and The Bronx. Cuban filmmaker Humberto Solás was the honoree, and the festival opened with his film Honey for Oshun. Among the special events featured at the third HFFNY was a panel discussion with visiting directors on the role played by Latin American literature in filmmaking, which included the films Dark Side of the Heart 2 by Argentine director Eliseo Subiela, Miracle in Rome by Colombian filmmaker Lisandro Duque, and Mexican director Arturo Ripestein's No One Writes to the Colonel, and a roundtable discussion with actor and activist Danny Glover and Congressman Charles Rangel at the Harvard Club on U.S. Cuban Relations.

The fourth festival ran March 26-April 2, 2003 with its main slate of screenings at the Clearview Cinema in Manhattan. Films also played at NYU Cantor Film Center and Anthology Film Archives, Sunnyside Center Cinema and the Museum of the Moving Image in Queens, and the Bronx Museum of the Arts and Hostos Center for the Arts & Culture in The Bronx. The festival opened with the NY premiere of the Cuban film Nada by Juan Carlos Cremata and closed with the NY premiere of the Colombian film Bolivar soy yo by Jorge Alí Triana. Special events included a tribute to Cuban filmmaker Julio García Espinosa and the presentation of Rogelio París' 1964 musical documentary Nosotros la música.

The fifth Havana Film Festival NY was presented by The New York Times and ran April 22–29, 2004. It paid homage to Puerto Rican filmmaker Jacobo Morales and included 37 films from Cuba, Mexico, Puerto Rico, Colombia, Chile, Argentina, Brazil and the Dominican Republic. The festival opened with the NY premiere of Cuban documentary Suite Habana by Fernando Pérez and closed with the NY premiere of Colombian comedy film El carro by Luis Orjuela. The main slate of screenings took place at Manhattan's Quad Cinema, with special programs at Hostos Center for the Arts & Culture in The Bronx and NYU's King Juan Carlos I of Spain Center. HFFNY 2005 free panels and events included: A Conversation with Jacobo Morales, Cuban Cinema Classics: Revolutionary Documentaries, and New Languages for Latin American Cinema- a roundtable discussion with filmmakers Miguel Coyula, Luis Ospina, Sergio Wolf, Sinnel Sandoval, Alejandro Fernandez, Patricia Riggen, Mercedes Jimenez, Luis Orjuela, Sandra Bilicich, Luciana Tomasi, Elias Jimenez, Pedro Diaz, Jacobo Morales, Alejandro Chomski, Fernando Pérez and Rigoberto Lopez.

The sixth HFFNY ran April 15–21, 2005, and included tributes to Cuban director Pastor Vega and Brazilian director Walter Salles. The program featured newly-released independent films from and about Latin American and the Caribbean alongside classics, documentaries, short and animated films from 12 countries. Free events occurred at NYU's King Juan Carlos Center and included the children's program Latin American Films for Children / Animation 4 Kids. Screenings also took place at the Quad Cinema in Manhattan, and the Museum of the Moving Image in Queens. HFFNY returned to the Quad Cinema April 21-27, 2006 for its seventh edition, with free events and screenings hosted by NYU's King Juan Carlos I of Spain Center, Hunter College, The New School, the Museum of the Moving Image, and the Metropolitan Museum of Art. Special programs included a tribute to the 20th anniversary of EICTV (Escuela Internacional de Cine y TV, San Antonio de los Baños, Cuba) presented by festival guest and EICTV co-founder Fernando Birri, and the children's program Latin American Films for Children / Animation 4 Kids. 

The eighth HFFNY ran April 13-19, 2007 at the Quad Cinema, with free events and screenings at NYU, the Museum of the Moving Image, and the Metropolitan Museum of Art, and included a tribute to Cuban actor Jorge Perugorría, a showcase of short films by NY-based filmmakers called A Small Lens on What's to Come and its children's program Latin American Films for Children. The Quad Cinema continued to be the main venue for the ninth HFFNY, which ran April 10-18, 2008 and honored Cuban director Juan Carlos Tabío, Cuban actor Luis Alberto Garcia and American documentary filmmaker Estela Bravo. The festival was a part of NYC's Immigrant Heritage Week and partnered with The New Children/New York Film Project to host a program devoted to films by New Children/New York filmmakers.

2009 - 10th anniversary 
HFFNY celebrated its 10th anniversary April 16-23, 2009 with a special kickoff presentation sponsored by TD Bank at Queens Theatre in the Park on April 14 called Short Time! a selection of four shorts by young filmmakers from Spain, Dominican Republic and the U.S. It officially opened at the New York DGA Theater on April 16 and continued its main slate of screenings at the Quad Cinema. Additional venues included the Metropolitan Museum of Art, the Bronx Museum of the Arts, NYU, and Hunter College. Retrospectives included The Urgent Cinema of Santiago Alvarez, Stranger Than Fiction: A Tribute to Luis Ospina, and Remembering Humberto Solás, 1941-2008. Among the free filmmaker panels and lectures were the programs Cinema of Puerto Rico: Challenges and Implications of a Rising Cinema featuring filmmakers Jacobo Morales, Lilian Rosado, Pedro Perez Rosado and Juanma Fernandez, and New Views (Nuevas Miradas) a presentation of award-winning films from Cuba's EICTV followed by a conversation between EICTV director Tanya Valette, professor and filmmaker Russell Porter, and Film London Chairman Sandy Lieberson, on the school and its students new visions for Latin American Cinema.

Havana Star Prize winners
In 2010 HFFNY began to award the Havana Star Prize to participating films for Best Film, Best Director, and Best Screenplay. The image for the prize was designed by Cuban artist Yoan Capote. In 2011 HFFNY added a category for Best Documentary, and in 2014 the Havana Star Prizes for Best Actor and Best Actress were introduced.

Best Film (fiction)

Best Director

Best Screenplay

Best Actor

Best Actress

Best Documentary

See also
 Havana Film Festival
 The Ludwig Foundation of Cuba

References

External links
American Friends of the Ludwig Foundation of Cuba
Havana Film Festival New York at the Internet Movie Database
Official Festival Website

Cinema of Cuba
Film festivals established in 2000
Film festivals in New York City
Latin American film festivals